Inter-Island Steam Navigation Co. v. Ward, 242 U.S. 1 (1916), was a civil lawsuit that came before the Supreme Court of the United States in 1916. It involved the Inter-Island Steam Navigation Company, a shipping company operating in the Hawaiian Islands. The Supreme Court declined to review a judgment of the Ninth Circuit Court of Appeals.

References
 

United States Supreme Court cases
1916 in United States case law
United States Supreme Court cases of the White Court